Tryphon is a genus of wasps belonging to the family Ichneumonidae.

Species 
Species within this genus include:

 Tryphon abditus
 Tryphon amasidis
 Tryphon ambiguus
 Tryphon americanus
 Tryphon aridus
 Tryphon armatus
 Tryphon asiaticus
 Tryphon atratus
 Tryphon atriceps
 Tryphon auricularis
 Tryphon bidentatus
 Tryphon bidentulus
 Tryphon bilineolatus
 Tryphon braccatus
 Tryphon brevipetiolaris
 Tryphon brunniventris
 Tryphon cadaver
 Tryphon calceolatus
 Tryphon californicus
 Tryphon caucasicus
 Tryphon cingulipes
 Tryphon collaris
 Tryphon communis
 Tryphon coquilletti
 Tryphon debilis
 Tryphon deliciosus
 Tryphon duplicatus
 Tryphon errator
 Tryphon eupitheciae
 Tryphon exareolatus
 Tryphon excavatus
 Tryphon exclamationis
 Tryphon exiguus
 Tryphon exobscurus
 Tryphon expers
 Tryphon explanatum
 Tryphon flavescens
 Tryphon flavilabris
 Tryphon flavoclypeatus
 Tryphon florissantensis
 Tryphon foraminatus
 Tryphon fulvilabris
 Tryphon fulviventris
 Tryphon geminator
 Tryphon grossus
 Tryphon haematopus
 Tryphon hamatus
 Tryphon hamulator
 Tryphon heliophilus
 Tryphon himalayensis
 Tryphon hinzi
 Tryphon humilis
 Tryphon illotus
 Tryphon incisus
 Tryphon jezoensis
 Tryphon laevis
 Tryphon lapideus
 Tryphon latrator
 Tryphon leucodactylus
 Tryphon leucostictus
 Tryphon lusorius
 Tryphon machaerus
 Tryphon mauritanicus
 Tryphon mesochoroides
 Tryphon mutilatus
 Tryphon mystax
 Tryphon nagahamensis
 Tryphon nigrinus
 Tryphon nigripes
 Tryphon obtusator
 Tryphon palmaris
 Tryphon peltiger
 Tryphon peregrinus
 Tryphon psilosagator
 Tryphon punctatus
 Tryphon rarus
 Tryphon relator
 Tryphon rempeli
 Tryphon rennenkampffii
 Tryphon rufonotatus
 Tryphon rugosus
 Tryphon rutilator
 Tryphon scapulator
 Tryphon seminiger
 Tryphon senex
 Tryphon sexpunctatus
 Tryphon signator
 Tryphon subsulcatus
 Tryphon talitzkii
 Tryphon teberda
 Tryphon thomsoni
 Tryphon thoracicus
 Tryphon townesi
 Tryphon translucens
 Tryphon trochanteratus
 Tryphon ussuriensis
 Tryphon utilis
 Tryphon viator
 Tryphon zavreli
 Tryphon zonatus

References

External links 
 
 

Ichneumonidae genera